Strathcona Science Provincial Park  is a provincial park in Alberta, Canada, located between Edmonton and Sherwood Park, south of the Yellowhead Highway and west of Anthony Henday Drive.

It was established on December 12, 1979 and is maintained by Alberta Tourism, Parks and Recreation.

This site was for thousands of years the site of an annual aboriginal camp, as it was located close enough to the river for transportation and trade and the bluffs of the river valley provided excellent bison-hunting opportunities.  The park was established to preserve the site from encroaching industrial development.  It was the site of archeological excavations in 1978 to 1980.

The park contains several abandoned interpretive buildings opened by the Alberta government in 1980 but now shuttered.  Remnants of the park's history as a public science center include tiled triangular obelisks, a boardwalk through the archaeological area, and a few interpretive plaques.  The area is safe but overgrown.

Activities
The following activities are available in the park:
Cross-country skiing ( trails)
Downhill skiing (in the Sunridge Ski Hill)
Front country hiking
Mountain biking ( of paths along North Saskatchewan River)
Tobogganing
Radio-controlled aircraft flying range

See also
List of provincial parks in Alberta
List of Canadian provincial parks
List of National Parks of Canada

References

External links

Parks in Edmonton
Archaeological sites in Alberta
First Nations history
Sherwood Park
Protected areas established in 1979
1979 establishments in Alberta
Science centers
Defunct museums in Canada
Provincial parks of Alberta